was a district located in Nagano Prefecture, Japan.

As of 2003, the district had an estimated population of 99,785 and a density of 117.22 persons per km2. The total area was 851.25 km2.

Until September 30, 2005 the district had only four municipalities left the day before the district dissolved:
 Horigane
 Hotaka
 Misato
 Toyoshina

On October 1, 2005, the towns of Hotaka and Toyoshina, and the villages of Horigane and Misato, along with the town of Akashina (from Higashichikuma District) were merged to create the city of Azumino. Minamiazumi District was dissolved as a result of this merger.

Timeline
1878 - Founded after Azumi District split into Minamiazumi and Kitaazumi Districts.
April 1, 2005 - The villages of Nagawa, Azumi and Azusagawa merged into the city of Matsumoto.
October 1, 2005 - The towns of Hotaka and Toyoshina, and the villages of Horigane and Misato, along with the town of Akashina (from Higashichikuma District) were merged to create the city of Azumino. Minamiazumi District was dissolved as a result of this merger.

Former districts of Nagano Prefecture